Playfair Cricket Annual is a compact annual about cricket that is published in the United Kingdom each April, just before the English cricket season is due to begin. It has been published every year since 1948. Its main purposes are to review the previous English season and to provide detailed career records and potted biographies of current players.  It is produced in a "pocket-sized" format, being approximately 5×4 in (i.e., about 13×10 cm), so that it is a convenient size for carrying to cricket matches. The front cover of each edition has featured a photograph of a prominent current cricketer. There is a popular myth that this "honour" has a "hex" or "curse" associated with it, as the player featured then invariably has a poor season.

Publications
The original publisher was Playfair Books Ltd of London, which had its office at Curzon Street when the first edition was published in April 1948; the company relocated soon afterwards to Haymarket. The name Playfair was chosen because it reads as "play fair", as confirmed by C B Fry who began his foreword to the first edition in 1948: "This Playfair Annual (and what a proper title for a book about the Noble Game) will commend itself to innumerable readers". The first editor was Peter West who was succeeded in 1954 by Gordon Ross. Roy Webber was the statistician at Playfair for many years and was described by West as "that ace of statisticians".

The Playfair Cricket Annual is one of a series of similar pocket sized sporting annuals published under the Playfair name. Others have included Playfair Football Annual, Playfair Rugby League Annual and Playfair Racing Annual. In addition the Playfair name was used for record books produced by Roy Webber and for the magazine Playfair Cricket Monthly. A number of tour brochures were also produced by Playfair Books.

Between 1948 and 1962 the annual was a larger size, 4¾×7¼ in (12×18 cm) and had a different style, being printed on glossy paper and including numerous photographs. In 1962 the Playfair titles were acquired by Dickens Press which had just published The Cricket Annual, edited by Roy Webber.  In 1963, Dickens published a new style Playfair Cricket Annual, keeping the same name but basing the size, format and price on The Cricket Annual. Therefore, the 2013 edition is the 66th in total, but the annual has been published in its current compact size only since the 1963 edition (the 16th).

In addition, Playfair Cricket World Cup Guide, in 1996, and Playfair Cricket World Cup 1999 were published in the same format as the regular annual to cover the International limited overs competitions in India/Pakistan/Sri Lanka and England/Scotland/Ireland/Netherlands in those years respectively. Both of those were also edited by Bill Frindall.

The current publisher is Headline Publishing Group with Ian Marshall, who succeeded Bill Frindall on an acting basis in 2009 and permanently for the 2010 edition, as editor.  There are several specialist contributors, notably Philip Bailey who compiles the career records.

The following tables provide a summary of each annual by reference to editor, size and price:

Larger format: 1948–1962

In each of the first 15 editions there was a 16-page photographic section in addition to the numbered pages.  The 1948 annual was actually called Playfair Books Cricket Annual but subsequent years were simply called Playfair Cricket Annual. There were two issues of the 1948 annual with a difference in the back cover. One had a Playfair logo, the other a Schweppes advertisement.

Compact format: 1963–present

For the forerunners to the annual in this format see The Cricket Annual.  

 
Bill Frindall died soon before the 2009 annual was completed, but received sole credit as editor on the front cover. The acknowledgements page credits Ian Marshall as "acting editor". Frindall's traditional preface was written by Jonathan Agnew.

From the 1998 edition onwards a thumbnail picture also appeared on the spine of the annual.  This has been a smaller version of the front cover photograph except in 1998 and 2008, when it was the back cover picture, and in 2006 and 2010 when the Ashes urn was depicted.

Compact format: World Cup Guides

Apart from those on the covers, there are no photographs in any of the annuals from 1963.

Eleven cricketers of the year
From 1950 to 1962 the annual produced a list of its Eleven Cricketers of the Year for the previous season. Tony Lock was selected 7 times, Peter May 6 times.

 1950: Trevor Bailey, Freddie Brown, Tom Burtt, Martin Donnelly, Tom Goddard, Walter Hadlee, Len Hutton, Roly Jenkins, John Langridge, Reg Simpson, Bert Sutcliffe
 1951: Godfrey Evans, Laurie Fishlock, Ken Grieves, Gilbert Parkhouse, Sonny Ramadhin, David Sheppard, Roy Tattersall, Alf Valentine, Everton Weekes, Frank Worrell, Doug Wright
 1952: Bob Appleyard, Alec Bedser, Geoffrey Chubb, Denis Compton, Tom Dollery, Tom Graveney, Jim Laker, Peter May, Jack Robertson, Eric Rowan, Willie Watson
 1953: Alec Bedser, Brian Close, Godfrey Evans, Tom Graveney, Len Hutton, Jim Laker, Tony Lock, Peter May, David Sheppard, Fred Trueman, Johnny Wardle
 1954: Trevor Bailey, Alec Bedser, Bruce Dooland, Bill Edrich, Lindsay Hassett, Neil Harvey, Len Hutton, Ray Lindwall, Tony Lock, Peter May, David Sheppard
 1955: Bob Appleyard, Denis Compton, Bruce Dooland, Les Jackson, Don Kenyon, Jim Laker, Peter Loader, Tony Lock, Fazal Mahmood, Brian Statham, Alan Watkins
 1956: Colin Cowdrey, Bruce Dooland, Peter Heine, Doug Insole, Tony Lock, Jackie McGlew, Roy Marshall, Brian Statham, Hugh Tayfield, John Waite
 1957: Denis Compton, Jim Laker, Gil Langley, Tony Lock, Peter May, Keith Miller, Peter Richardson, David Sheppard, Stuart Surridge, George Tribe, Cyril Washbrook
 1958: Colin Cowdrey, Tom Graveney, Peter Loader, Tony Lock, Peter May, John Murray, Jim Parks, Derek Shackleton, MJK Smith, Collie Smith, Fred Trueman
 1959: Dennis Brookes, Godfrey Evans, Colin Ingleby-Mackenzie, Les Jackson, Tony Lock, Roy Marshall, Peter May, Arthur Milton, Derek Shackleton, Raman Subba Row, Willie Watson
 1960: Abbas Ali Baig, Trevor Bailey, Ken Barrington, Ronnie Burnet, Colin Cowdrey, Ray Illingworth, Jim Parks, Geoff Pullar, MJK Smith, Jim Stewart, Bryan Stott
 1961: Trevor Bailey, Ted Dexter, Norman Horner, Henry Horton, Tony Lewis, Alan Moss, Michael Norman, Eric Russell, Brian Statham, Fred Trueman, Peter Wight
 1962: Bill Alley, Richie Benaud, Jack Flavell, Colin Ingleby-Mackenzie, Bill Lawry, Ken Mackay, Roy Marshall, John Murray, Peter Parfitt, Derek Shackleton, Raman Subba Row

County register, averages, and records
Since the first compact edition of 1963, the core of the publication has been a section providing a county by county list of current cricketers with potted biographies, their county averages in the previous season together with some introductory notes on the county and the major county records.

The county clubs are listed in alphabetical order.  Until 1962, the biographies occupied less space and were not sorted by county club.  Introductory information about each county club has expanded, largely because of the introduction of limited overs cricket competitions. A much longer list of officials is now given; originally only the secretary and captain were given.  Until 1972 most editions gave potted scores for each club's home matches but lack of space caused this to be removed.

Current contents
Currently, the annual's contents typically include:
Preface, Foreword and Acknowledgements
Test Cricket
Details of England's records against the touring teams
Register of the touring teams
Statistical highlights of the previous year
Scorecards of the previous year
Current career averages
Test match records
County Cricket
County register, averages and records
Umpires register
University registers
Touring team registers
Statistical highlights of the previous season
Competition results and tables
Cricketer of the year awards
First-class averages for the season
First-class career averages
List 'A' career averages
First-class records
Limited over and T20 Internationals
Summary of England matches
Career averages
Records
Other Cricket
Oxbridge matches
Women's cricket
Fixtures

Status of matches
As one of the leading statistical cricket publications, Playfair has to take a view on the status of Test, One Day International, first-class and domestic one-day (i.e. List A) matches.  It generally complies with the statistics published by Wisden Cricketers' Almanack and will sometimes ignore official rulings: e.g., the ICC ruling that South African rebel tours between 1981–82 and 1989–90 were not first-class matches. The 2010 edition overturned Frindall's long-held view that the match between Australia and an ICC World XI in 2005/06 should not be regarded as a Test Match and now includes it in its Test record section.

References

External links
 

Cricket books
Cricket collectibles
Sports reference works